Eric Barber (25 March 1926 – 25 April 2015) was an English footballer who played as a forward or winger in the Football League for Rochdale. He was on the books of Stockport County, Sheffield United and Bolton Wanderers without playing league football for any of them, and also played non-league football for Macclesfield Town (two spells), Witton Albion and Stalybridge Celtic.

References

1926 births
2015 deaths
Footballers from Stockport
English footballers
Association football forwards
Stockport County F.C. players
Sheffield United F.C. players
Macclesfield Town F.C. players
Bolton Wanderers F.C. players
Rochdale A.F.C. players
Witton Albion F.C. players
Stalybridge Celtic F.C. players
English Football League players